15th Group may refer to:

 No. 15 Group RAF, a formation of the UK Royal Air Force
 15th Carrier Air Group, a formation of the United Kingdom Royal Navy
 15th Army Group, a formation of the United States and United Kingdom armies during World War II

See also
XV Corps (disambiguation)
15th Army (disambiguation)
15th Division (disambiguation)
15th Wing (disambiguation)
15th Brigade (disambiguation)
15th Regiment (disambiguation)
15 Squadron (disambiguation)